Joe or Joseph Bradley may refer to:

Politicians
 Jeb Bradley (Joseph E. Bradley, born 1952), Republican member of the United States House of Representatives for New Hampshire
 Joseph P. Bradley Jr. (1926–1994), Pennsylvania politician

Others
 Joe Bradley (basketball) (1928–1987), American basketball player
 Joe Bradley (artist) (born 1975), American painter 
 Joseph P. Bradley (1813–1892), American jurist on the United States Supreme Court
 Joseph Bradley (buccaneer) ( 1670), English buccaneer

Characters
 The character played by Gregory Peck in the 1953 file Roman Holiday
 The character played by Tom Conti in the 1987 remake Roman Holiday
 Joe Bradley (90210)

See also
 Bradley Joseph (born 1965), American composer
 Bradley